Saint-Cyprien is a municipality in Rivière-du-Loup Regional County Municipality in the Bas-Saint-Laurent region of Quebec, Canada.

See also
 List of municipalities in Quebec

References

External links
 

Municipalities in Quebec
Incorporated places in Bas-Saint-Laurent